Suliszewo may refer to the following places:
Suliszewo, Pomeranian Voivodeship (north Poland)
Suliszewo, Choszczno County in West Pomeranian Voivodeship (north-west Poland)
Suliszewo, Drawsko County in West Pomeranian Voivodeship (north-west Poland)